Leeds University Business School is a business school in the University of Leeds, in Leeds, West Yorkshire, England. The school is accredited by AACSB, AMBA and EQUIS.

Location 

Leeds University Business School is housed in several buildings at the University of Leeds, including the 19th-century Maurice Keyworth building (previously Leeds Grammar School), Charles Thackrah building and Clarendon building. The School also shares the Newlyn building and Esther Simpson building with the School of Law, which officially opened in October 2019 and March 2022 respectively. The Marks & Spencer company archive is also housed here, containing over 60,000 artefacts and pieces moved there in 2009 from London to Leeds, the birthplace of the company. Further buildings include the Liberty Building, home to the Faculty of Law, and Western Lecture Theatre.

Profile and reputation 
The Business School is a top ten UK business and management research institution. Over 200 academic staff conduct research across the six departments of Accounting and Finance, Economics, International Business, Management, Marketing, and Work and Employment Relations In 2019, Professor Julia Bennell was appointed the new Executive Dean.

Alumni 
Notable Business School alumni include:
Roger Whiteside, CEO Greggs
José Ángel Gurría, Secretary General of the OECD
 Sir Peter Hendy CBE, Chairman of Network Rail
John R Hirst, former CEO of the Met Office
 Subir Raha, former chairman and managing director of the Oil and Natural Gas Corporation
Jayant Krishna, Group CEO of the UK India Business Council and former CEO of the National Skill Development Corporation
Sudhir Chaturvedi, President and Executive board member at Larsen & Toubro Infotech

Current notable academics 
Leeds University Business School has over 200 academic staff.
Peter Buckley (academic)
Kevin Keasey

References

External links 
 Leeds University Business School

Business schools in England
University of Leeds
1997 establishments in England
Educational institutions established in 1997